Chilblain lupus erythematosus is a chronic, unremitting form of lupus erythematosus with the fingertips, rims of ears, calves, and heels affected, especially in women.

See also
 Lupus erythematosus
 List of cutaneous conditions

References

External links 

Cutaneous lupus erythematosus